An ice piedmont consists of "Ice covering a coastal strip of low-lying land backed by mountains."

Further reading 
  Vijay P. Singh, Pratap Singh, Umesh K. Haritashya, editors, Encyclopedia of Snow, Ice and Glaciers, P 49

References
The Crossing of Antarctica by Sir Vivian Fuchs and Sir Edmund Hillary (Glossary, page 296) Cassell, London, 1958

Piedmont